Integrated quantum photonics, uses photonic integrated circuits to control photonic quantum states for applications in quantum technologies. As such, integrated quantum photonics provides a promising approach to the miniaturisation and scaling  up of optical quantum circuits. The major application of integrated quantum photonics is Quantum technology:, for example quantum computing, quantum communication, quantum simulation, quantum walks and quantum metrology.

History 

Linear optics was not seen as a potential technology platform for quantum computation until the seminal work of Knill, Laflamme, and Milburn, which demonstrated the feasibility of linear optical quantum computers using detection and feed-forward to produce deterministic two-qubit gates. Following this there were several experimental proof-of-principle demonstrations of two-qubit gates performed in bulk optics. It soon became clear that integrated optics could provide a powerful enabling technology for this emerging field.  Early experiments in integrated optics demonstrated the feasibility of the field via demonstrations of high-visibility non-classical and classical interference. Typically, linear optical components such as directional couplers (which act as beamsplitters between waveguide modes), and phase shifters to form nested Mach–Zehnder interferometers are used to encode qubit in the spatial degree of freedom. That is, a single photon is in super position between two waveguides, where the zero and one state of the qubit correspond to the photon's presence in one or the other waveguide. These basic components are combined to produce more complex structures, such as entangling gates and reconfigurable quantum circuits. Reconfigurability is achieved by tuning the phase shifters, which leverage thermo- or electro-optical effects.

Another area of research in which integrated optics will prove pivotal in its development is Quantum communication and has been marked by extensive experimental development demonstrating, for example, quantum key distribution (QKD), quantum relays based on entanglement swapping, and quantum repeaters.

Since the birth of integrated quantum optics experiments have ranged from technological demonstrations, for example integrated single photon sources and integrated single photon detectors, to fundamental tests of nature, new methods for quantum key distribution, and the generation of new quantum states of light.  It has also been demonstrated that a single reconfigurable integrated device is sufficient to implement the full field of linear optics, by using a reconfigurable universal interferometer.

As the field has progressed new quantum algorithms have been developed which provide short and long term routes towards the demonstration of the superiority of quantum computers over their classical counterparts.  Cluster state quantum computation is now generally accepted as the approach that will be used to develop a fully fledged quantum computer.  Whilst development of quantum computer will require the synthesis of many different aspects of integrated optics, boson sampling seeks to demonstrate the power of quantum information processing via technologies readily available and is therefore a very promising near term algorithm to doing so.  In fact shortly after its proposal there were several small scale experimental demonstrations of the boson sampling algorithm

Introduction 
Quantum photonics is the science of generating, manipulating and detecting light in regimes where it is possible to coherently control individual quanta of the light field (photons). Historically, quantum photonics has been fundamental to exploring quantum phenomena, for example with the EPR paradox and Bell test experiments,. Quantum photonics is also expected to play a central role in advancing future technologies, such as Quantum computing, Quantum key distribution and Quantum metrology. Photons are particularly attractive carriers of quantum information due to their low decoherence properties, light-speed transmission and ease of manipulation. Quantum photonics experiments traditionally involved 'bulk optics' technology—individual optical components (lenses, beamsplitters, etc.) mounted on a large optical table, with combined mass of hundreds of kilograms.

Integrated quantum photonics application of photonic integrated circuit technology to quantum photonics, and seen as an important step in developing useful quantum technology. Photonic chips offer the following advantages over bulk optics:
 Miniaturisation - Size, weight, and power consumption are reduced by orders of magnitude by virtue of smaller system size.
 Stability - Miniaturised components produced with advanced lithographic techniques produce waveguides and components which are inherently phase stable (coherent) and do not require optical alignment
 Experiment size - Large numbers of optical components can be integrated on a device measuring a few square centimeters.
Manufacturability - Devices can be mass manufactured with very little increase in cost.
Being based on well-developed fabrication techniques, the elements employed in Integrated Quantum Photonics are more readily miniaturisable, and products based on this approach can be manufactured using existing production methodologies.

Materials 
Control over photons can be achieved with integrated devices that can be realised in different material platforms such as silica, silicon, gallium arsenide, lithium niobate and indium phosphide and silicon nitride.

Silica 
Three methods for using silica:

 Flame hydrolisis.
 Photolithography.
 Direct write - only uses single material and laser (use computer controlled laser to damage the glass and user lateral motion and focus to write paths with required refractive indices to produce waveguides). This method has the benefit of not needing a clean room. This is the most common method now for making silica waveguides, and is excellent for rapid prototyping. It has also been used in several demonstrations of topological photonics.

The main challenges of the silica platform are the low refractive index contrast, the lack of active tunability post fabrication (as opposed to all the other platforms) and the difficulty of mass production with reproducibility and high yield due to the serial nature of the inscription process. Recent work has shown the possibility of dynamically reconfiguring these silica devices using heaters, albeit requiring moderately high power.

Silicon 
A big advantage of using silicon is that the circuits can be tuned actively using integrated thermal microheaters or p-i-n modulators, after the devices have been fabricated. The other big benefit of silicon is its compatibility with CMOS technology, which allows leveraging the mature fabrication infrastructure of the semiconductor electronics industry.  The structures are different from modern electronic ones, however, they are readily scalable. Silicon has a really high refractive index of ~3.5 at the 1550 nm wavelength commonly used in optical telecommunications. It therefor offers one of the highest component densities in integrated photonics. The large contrast in refractive index with class (1.44) allows waveguides formed of silicon surrounded by glass to have very tight bends, which allows for high-density of components and reduced system size. Large silicon-on-insulator (SOI) wafers up to 300 mm in diameter can be obtained commercially, making the technology both available and reproducible. Many of the largest systems (up to several hundred components) have been demonstrated on the silicon photonics platform, with up to eight simultaneous photons, generation of graph states (cluster states), and up to 15 dimensional qudits). Photon sources in silicon waveguide circuits leverage silicon's third-order nonlinearity to produce pairs of photons in spontaneous four-wave mixing. Silicon is opaque for wavelengths of light below ~1200 nm, limiting applicability to infra-red photons. Phase modulators based on thermo-optic and electro-optic phases are characteristically slow (KHz) and lossy (several dB) respectively, limiting applications and the ability to perform feed-forward measurements for quantum computation)

Lithium Niobate 
Lithium niobate offers a large second-order optical nonlinearity, enabling generation of photon pairs via spontaneous parametric down-conversion.  This can also be leveraged to manipulate phase and perform mode conversion at fast speeds, and offer a promising route to feed-forward for quantum computation, multiplexed (deterministic) single photons sources).  Historically waveguides are defined using titanium indiffusion, resulting in large waveguides (cm bend radius) but recent progress in processing has enabled thin film lithium niobate waveguides now offer competitive losses and density, surpassing that of silicon.

III-V Materials on Insulator 
Photonic waveguides made from group III-V materials on insulator, such as (Al)GaAs and InP, provide some of the largest second and third order nonlinearities, large refractive index contrast providing large modal confinement, and wide optical bandgaps resulting in negligible two-photon absorption at telecommunications wavelengths. III-V materials are capable of low-loss passive and high-speed active components, such as active gain for on-chip lasers, high-speed electro-optic modulators (Pockels and Kerr effects), and on-chip detectors. Compared to other materials such as silica, silicon, and silicon nitride, the large optical nonlinearity simultaneously with low waveguide loss and tight modal confinement have resulted in ultrabright entangled-photon pair generation from microring resonators.

Fabrication 
Conventional fabrication technologies are based on photolithographic processes, which enable strong miniaturization and mass production. In quantum optics applications a relevant role has been played also by the direct inscription of the circuits by femtosecond lasers or UV lasers; these are serial fabrication technologies, which are particularly convenient for research purposes, where novel designs have to be tested with rapid fabrication turnaround.

However, laser-written waveguides are not suitable for mass production and miniaturization due to the serial nature of the inscription technique, and due to the very low refractive index contrast allowed by these materials, as opposed to silicon photonic circuits. Femtosecond laser written quantum circuits have proven particularly suited for the manipulation of the polarization degree of freedom  and for building circuits with innovative three-dimensional design. Quantum information is encoded on-chip in either the path, polarisation, time bin or frequency state of the photon, and manipulated using active integrated components in a compact and stable manner.

Components 
Though the same fundamental components are used in quantum as classical photonic integrated circuits, there are also some practical differences. Since amplification of single photon quantum states is not possible (no-cloning theorem), loss is the top priority in components in quantum photonics.

Single photon sources are built from building blocks (waveguides, directional couplers, phase shifters). Typically, optical ring resonators, and long waveguide sections provide increased nonlinear interaction for photon pair generation, though progress is also being made to integrate solid state systems single photon sources based on quantum dots,  and nitrogen-vacancy centers with waveguide photonic circuits.

See also 

 Linear optical quantum computing
 Quantum information
 Quantum key distribution
 List of companies involved in quantum computing or communication
 List of quantum processors

References

External links 
 QUCHIP Project
 3D-QUEST Project
 Center for Quantum Photonics, University of Bristol
 Fast Group, Istituto di Fotonica e Nanotecnologie, Consiglio Nazionale delle Ricerche
 Integrated Quantum Optics, Paderborn University
 Integrated Quantum Technologies, Griffith University

Photonics